WWIN (1400 kHz) is a commercial AM radio station in Baltimore, Maryland.  Owned by Urban One, it broadcasts an urban gospel radio format.  Some Christian talk and teaching programs are heard middays and Sundays.  The studios are in Woodlawn, shared with sister stations WERQ-FM, WOLB and WWIN-FM.

WWIN is powered at 500 watts.  The transmitter is on East Monument Street in the Orangeville section of East Baltimore.

History
WWIN first signed on in 1951.  For most of its history, it has been programmed for Baltimore's African-American community.  Originally it played R&B and soul music, with some urban gospel in early mornings and on Sunday.  In later years, as most listeners switched to FM for contemporary music, WWIN switched to urban gospel full time.

References

External links
WWIN Website

FCC History Cards for WWIN

Gospel radio stations in the United States
Urban One stations
WIN